The Grêmio Recreativo e Esportivo Reunidas, also known as Vôlei Futuro, were a Brazilian volleyball team based in Araçatuba, São Paulo. The team was folded in July 2013 after finishing ninth in the 2012–13 Brazilian Superliga.

Current squad 
Squad as of October 21, 2012

Head coach:  Cézar Douglas
Assistant coach:  José Paulo Peron

Honors
Brazilian Superliga
Runners-up (1): 2011–12

Campeonato Paulista
Winners (1): 2010

Jogos Abertos do Interior
Winners (2): 2010, 2011

See also
Vôlei Futuro (women's volleyball)

References

External links
Official website

Volleyball clubs in São Paulo (state)
Volleyball clubs established in 2006
Volleyball clubs disestablished in 2013
Sports teams in São Paulo
Brazilian volleyball clubs
2006 establishments in Brazil
2013 disestablishments in Brazil